The 48th Biathlon World Championships was held in Oslo, Norway from 3 to 13 March 2016.

There were 11 competitions in total: sprint, pursuit, individual, mass start, relay races for men and women, and mixed relay. All the events during this championships also counted towards the Biathlon World Cup.

Host selection
Oslo was the sole candidate for this championship. Oslo was announced as the host city on 2 September 2012 during the X IBU Congress in Merano, Italy. Two years earlier Oslo lost Biathlon World Championships 2015 to Kontiolahti. This was the sixth time that these World Championships were held in Oslo; the city had previously hosted the event in 1986, 1990 (certain events held in Oslo due to difficult weather in the host city of Minsk), 1999 (certain events held in Oslo due to difficult weather in the host city of Kontiolahti), 2000 and 2002 (only the mass start as it was not on the program for the 2002 Olympics).

Schedule

All times are local (UTC+1).

Medal summary

Medal table

Top athletes
All athletes with two or more medals.

Medal winners

Men

Women

Mixed

References

External links

IBU 

 
2016
2016 in biathlon
2016 in Norwegian sport
International sports competitions in Oslo
Biathlon competitions in Norway
2010s in Oslo
March 2016 sports events in Europe
Holmenkollen